The Beach soccer at the Asian Beach Games is a Beach soccer competition of the Asian Beach Games. It was first held in 2008 in Indonesia.

Results

Medal table

Participating nations
Legend
QF — Quarterfinals
R1 — Round 1

See also
Beach Soccer World Cup
AFC Beach Soccer Asian Cup
Football at the Asian Games
FIFA
Asian Football Confederation

References

External links
 Official site of 2010 Asian Beach Games

 
Asian Football Confederation competitions for national teams
Asian Beach Games
Sports at the Asian Beach Games